Zarechye-Odintsovo is a Russian women's volleyball club based in Odintsovo. The club was founded in 1987 and plays in the super league, the top Russian league.

History
The club was established in 1987. The first title came in 1995, with the Russian Cup. Five more cups were added with victories in 2002, 2003, 2004, 2006 and 2007. The first Russian Super League title came in 2007–08 and the second in 2009–10. In European competitions, the club was runner-up of the CEV Champions League in the 2007–08 edition, losing the final against Despar Colussi Perugia. The team won its first European competition in 2013–14 at the CEV Challenge Cup, beating Beşiktaş in the final.

Honours

National competitions
  Russian Super League: 2
2007–08, 2009–10

  Russian Cup: 6 
1995, 2002, 2003, 2004, 2006, 2007

International competitions
  CEV Challenge Cup: 1
2013–14

Team Roster
Season 2018–2019

Notable players

  Tatiana Kosheleva
  Svetlana Kryuchkova
  Yulia Merkulova
  Lyubov Sokolova
  Paula Pequeno
  Walewska Oliveira
  Margareta Kozuch
  Antonella Del Core
  Iryna Zhukova

References

External links

Odintsovo official website 

Russian volleyball clubs
Volleyball clubs established in 1987
1987 establishments in Russia
Sport in Moscow Oblast